British Oxygen Co Ltd v Minister of Technology [1970] UKHL 4 is a UK constitutional law case, concerning judicial review.

Facts
British Oxygen claimed that it should be given grants by the Board of Trade for £4m it spent on gas cylinders costing £20 each, in its atmospheric gas and hydrogen manufacturing business. The Board had a discretionary power to give grants to help firms with capital expenditure under the Industrial Development Act 1966 s 13(1). Its policy was not to give grants for items under £25. British Oxygen Co. Ltd. argued that its application was turned down without properly considering its merits.

Judgment
The House of Lords accepted that the department was entitled to make a rule or policy, if it was prepared to listen to arguments for the exercise of individual discretion. On the facts, it was entitled to refuse the application.

Lord Reid said the following:

Lord Dilhorne said the right might be described as one to ask that the policy is changed.

Lord Morris, Lord Wilberforce, Lord Diplock agreed.

See also

United Kingdom constitutional law

References

United Kingdom constitutional case law